Misti Traya is an American actress. She landed her first prime time television series regular role playing 15-year-old Allison Reeves in The WB's comedy Living with Fran. She is the daughter of actress Kiersten Warren.

Life and career
Traya was born in Honolulu, Hawaii. She worked behind-the-scenes on the independent film, Havoc, in which she received an on-camera role. Within weeks of her first actual audition, she landed recurring roles on Joan of Arcadia and Huff.

Traya completed two feature films, Dying for Dolly, a Lion's Gate film directed by Ron Underwood, starring Chazz Palminteri and Usher, as well as Material Girls, produced by Maverick Films, directed by Martha Coolidge, and starring Hilary Duff and Haylie Duff. She is currently working with visual artist Mario García Torres on his six-minute film, One Minute To Act A Title: Kim Jong Il Favorite Movies, intended to circulate in the contemporary art arena of museums and galleries.

Traya also starred in VH1's I Love the New Millennium.

Personal life 
Traya is married and has a daughter (b. 2011). She lives in London.

Filmography

References

External links
 

American film actresses
American television actresses
Actresses from Los Angeles
Actresses from Honolulu
Year of birth missing (living people)
Living people
Sarah Lawrence College alumni
21st-century American actresses